Merrill Meeks Flood (1908 – 1991) was an American mathematician, notable for developing, with Melvin Dresher, the basis of the game theoretical Prisoner's dilemma model of cooperation and conflict while being at RAND in 1950 (Albert W. Tucker gave the game its prison-sentence interpretation, and thus the name by which it is known today).

Biography 
Flood received an MA in mathematics at the University of Nebraska, and a PhD at Princeton University in 1935 under the supervision of Joseph Wedderburn, for the dissertation Division by Non-singular Matric Polynomials.

In the 1930s he started working at Princeton University, and after the War he worked at the Rand Corporation, Columbia University, the University of Michigan and the University of California.

In the 1950s Flood was one of the founding members of TIMS and its second President in 1955. End 1950s he was among the first members of the Society for General Systems Research. In 1961, he was elected President of the Operations Research Society of America (ORSA), and from 1962 to 1965 he served as Vice President of the Institute of Industrial Engineers. In 1983 he was awarded ORSA's George E. Kimball Medal.

He was elected to the 2002 class of Fellows of the Institute for Operations Research and the Management Sciences.

Work 
Flood is considered a pioneer in the field of management science and operations research, who has been able to apply their techniques to problems on many levels of society. According to Xu (2001) "as early as 1936–1946, he applied innovative systems analysis to public problems and developed cost-benefit analysis in the civilian sector and cost effectiveness analysis in the military sector".

Traveling salesman problem 
In the 1940s Flood publicized the name Traveling salesman problem (TSP) within the mathematical community at mass. Flood publicized the traveling salesman problem in 1948 by presenting it at the RAND Corporation. According to Flood "when I was struggling with the problem in connecting with a school-bus routing study in New Jersey".

Even more important, as far as common usage goes, Dr. Flood himself claimed to have coined the term "software" in the late 1940s.

Hitchcock transportation problem 
Equally at home in his original field of the mathematics of matrices and in the pragmatic trenches of the industrial engineer, his research addressed an impressive array of operations research problems. His 1953 paper on the Hitchcock transportation problem is often cited, but he also published work on the traveling salesman problem, and an algorithm for solving the von Neumann hide and seek problem.

Publications 
 1948, A Game Theoretic Study of the Tactics of Area Defense, RAND Research Memorandum
 1949, Illustrative example of application of Koopmans' transportation theory to scheduling military tanker fleet, RAND Research Memorandum.
 1951, A Preference Experiment. RAND Research Paper
 1951, A Preference Experiment (Series 2, Trial 1).RAND Research Paper
 1952, A Preference Experiment (Series 2, Trials 2, 3, 4). RAND Research Paper
 1952, Aerial Bombing Tactics : General Considerations (A World War II Study), RAND Research Memorandum.
 1952, On Game-Learning Theory and Some Decision-Making Experiments. RAND Research Paper
 1952, Preference Experiment. RAND Research Memorandum
 1952, Some Group Interaction Models. RAND Research Memorandum

References

External links 
Biography of Merrill Flood from the Institute for Operations Research and the Management Sciences (INFORMS)
An interview by Albert Tucker (San Francisco on May 14, 1984).

1908 births
1991 deaths
20th-century American mathematicians
Game theorists
American operations researchers
Princeton University alumni
RAND Corporation people
University of Michigan staff
University of Michigan faculty
Fellows of the Institute for Operations Research and the Management Sciences